Jasper is a city in, and the county seat of, Dubois County, Indiana, United States, located along the Patoka River. The population was 16,703 at the 2020 census making it the 48th largest city in Indiana. On November 4, 2007, Dubois County returned to the Eastern Time Zone, after having moved to the Central Time Zone the previous year. Land use in the area is primarily agricultural. The Indiana Baseball Hall of Fame, which honors players and others associated with the national pastime who were born or lived in Indiana, is located in Jasper.

History
Jasper was founded in 1818. The Enlow family were the first settlers of the town. Jasper was originally going to be named "Eleanor" after the wife of early settler Joseph Enlow, but she opted to suggest a name herself, and named the city after a passage in the Bible (Revelation 21:19).

Jasper was not officially platted until 1830. That year, the community became the new county seat of Dubois County, succeeding Portersville.

The Jasper post office has been in operation since 1832. During the New Deal era, Jessie Hull Mayer won a federal commission to paint a mural as part of the Section of Painting and Sculpture′s projects, later called the Section of Fine Arts, of the Treasury Department. Indiana Farming Scene in Late Autumn depicts a harvest scene on a farmstead, with no indication of the town. In 1975, the painting was featured as part of a film, Art for Main Street: The Indiana Post Office Murals, produced by the Indiana Historical Society.

Jasper was incorporated as a town in 1866, and was incorporated into a city in 1915.

Geography

The city is located in the townships of Bainbridge,  Madison and Boone.

Climate

The climate in this area is characterized by hot, humid summers and generally cool winters.  According to the Köppen Climate Classification system, Jasper, IN has a humid subtropical climate, abbreviated "Cfa" on climate maps.

Demographics

Jasper is the principal city of the Jasper Micropolitan Statistical Area, a micropolitan area that covers Dubois and Pike counties and had a combined population of 54,734 at the 2010 census.

2010 census
As of the census of 2010, the population of Jasper was 15,038 and there were 5,994 households. The gender makeup of the city is 49.2% male and 50.8% female.

Ethnicities
The racial makeup of the city was:
 93.6% white
 7.7% Hispanic (of any race)
 0.4% African American
 0.9% Asian
 0.2% Native American
 4.0% from other races
 0.9% from two or more races.

Age
Of the total Jasper population:
 14.0% were 1-9
 12.9% were 10-19
 12.1% were 20-29
 11.9% were 30-39
 14.4% were 40-49
 13.6% were 50-59
 9.1% were 60-69
 6.1% were 70-79
 5.4% were 80 or older
 Median age was 39.3 years. For males it was 36.9 years and for females, 41.6 years.

Income
 Overall median household income in Jasper is $53,968
 Median income for a family is $65,903
 Males had a median income of $37,432
 Females had a median income of $32,218
 The per capita income for the city is $28,540
 About 5.7% of families and 7.6% of the population are below the poverty line, including 8.2% of those under age 18 and 3.9% of those age 65 and over.

Economy
Jasper is a regional center in Southwestern Indiana, with German Catholic ancestral roots. Jasper has been called the "Wood Capital of the World", with furniture companies such as Kimball International and Masterbrand Cabinets located here. Also located in Jasper are Southern Indiana Education Center, Jasper Engines and Transmissions, and a satellite campus of Vincennes University.

In 2022, Jasper won the annual Strong Towns "Strongest Town" competition. 

The largest industry sectors by employment in Jasper are manufacturing, retail, and health care and social services.

Top employers
According to the Jasper Chamber of Commerce

Arts and culture
Jasper has the only municipally supported Arts Council in Indiana; it is part of city government. The City of Jasper and the Jasper Community Arts Commission won the Governor's Arts Award in 1987 and 2007.

The Jasper Strassenfest is a four-day event held annually during the first weekend in August. The "Fest" is a celebration between Jasper and its German sister-city Pfaffenweiler, a village in southwest Germany, and some citizens of Pfaffenweiler travel to Jasper around this time of year. The street festival encompasses the city square, and features food stands, rides, a beer garden, parade, fireworks, golf tournament, beauty pageant (Miss Strassenfest), fishing tournament, and a network of German "Polka Masses" at the three Roman Catholic parishes.

In 2021, the Thyen-Clark Cultural Center and public lending library opened.

Sites listed on National Register of Historic Places

Sites in Jasper listed on the National Register of Historic Places listings in Dubois County, Indiana include:
 Dubois County Courthouse
 Gramelspacher-Gutzweiler House
 John Opel House
 St. Joseph Catholic Church
 Louis H. Sturm Hardware Store

Parks and recreation

Jasper has 18 city parks covering .

Government

The following persons have held the office of mayor of Jasper, Indiana.

Education

In 1970, the school system of Ireland, Indiana, was consolidated into that of Jasper.

Schools in Jasper include:
 Jasper High School (public, grades 9 to 12)
 Jasper Middle School (public 6 to 8)
 Ireland Elementary School (public pre-K to 5)
 Jasper Elementary School (public pre-K to 5)
 Holy Trinity Catholic School
 West Campus at St. Mary's Ireland (private pre-K)
 Central Campus at Precious Blood (private pre K to 2)
 East Campus at Holy Family (private 3 to 8)
 Vincennes University (Jasper Campus)

Media

Newspapers
 The American Eagle, Jasper's first newspaper, operated from 1846 to 1848.
 The Democrat (1857), the Times (1865), and another Times (1879–1891).
 The Jasper Weekly Courier, a Democratic newspaper, served Dubois County from 1858 to 1921.
 The Dubois County Herald, founded in 1895, currently circulates about 10,000 copies per day to residents of Dubois, Spencer, and Pike counties. The Herald is one of only 300 independently-owned newspapers in the United States.
 The Jasper News Journal is a free newspaper.

Radio
The following stations are licensed in the city of Jasper
 91.7 FM WJPR
 93.7 FM WJWS "JHS The Scratch"
 104.7 FM WITZ-FM
 990 AM WITZ-AM

Infrastructure

Highways
  U.S. Route 231
  Indiana State Road 164
  Indiana State Road 162
  Indiana State Road 56

Notable people
 Mike Braun, U.S. Senator and former member of the Indiana House of Representatives
 Daniel M. Buechlein, former Roman Catholic Archbishop of Indianapolis
 Brad Ellsworth, former member of the U.S. House of Representatives
 Spike Gehlhausen, Indy car driver
 Paul Hoffman, Purdue All-American, NBA Rookie of the Year, NBA Champion
 Shane Lindauer, member of the Indiana House of Representatives
 Matt Mauck, National Football League quarterback; led the LSU Tigers to the 2003 national championship
 Mark Messmer, member of the Indiana State Senate
 Frank W. Milburn, World War II and Korean War general
 Richard M. Milburn, Indiana Attorney General
 Edith Pfau, artist
 Scott Rolen, Major League Baseball player
 Ralph K. Rottet, Lieutenant general, U.S. Marine Corps
 William J. Schroeder, longest lived person on a Jarvik-7
 Bernard V. Vonderschmitt, most noted as a co-founder of leading FPGA producer Xilinx.
 Wilfrid Worland, Washington, D.C.–area architect

In popular culture 
The fictional town of Orson, Indiana, from the TV series The Middle, is based on Jasper.

Sister cities
Jasper participates in the sister cities program, as designated by Sister Cities International, and is a sister city of Pfaffenweiler, Baden-Württemberg, Germany.

See also
 List of public art in Jasper, Indiana

References

External links

 
 Jasper Chamber of Commerce